Templehouse Lough (also Templehouse Lake) is a freshwater lake in the northwest of Ireland. It is located in south County Sligo and forms part of the course of the Owenmore River.

Geography
The lake has numerous crannogs (artificial islands).

Hydrology
Templehouse Lough is fed by the Owenmore River and other streams entering at the lake's southern end. The lake drains north into the continuation of the Owenmore River, which then flows north to join the Ballysadare River.

Natural history
Fish present in Templehouse Lough include roach, perch, pike and the critically endangered European eel. A number of duck species winter at the lake including teal, wigeon, mallard, tufted duck and goldeneye. Wader bird species include lapwing, curlew and Greenland white-fronted goose. Other bird species found at the lake include mute swan, great crested grebe and heron.

Templehouse Lough is part of the Templehouse and Cloonacleigha Loughs Special Area of Conservation as a hard water lake habitat.

See also
List of loughs in Ireland

References

Templehouse